Coshocton County is a county located in the U.S. state of Ohio. As of the 2020 census, the population was 36,612. Its county seat and largest city is Coshocton. The county lies within the Appalachian region of the state. The county was formed on January 31, 1810, from portions of Muskingum and Tuscarawas Counties and later organized in 1811. Its name comes from the Delaware Indian language and has been translated as "union of waters" or "black bear crossing". The Coshocton, OH Micropolitan Statistical Area includes all of Coshocton County.

Geography

Adjacent counties
Holmes County (north)
Tuscarawas County (east)
Guernsey County (southeast)
Muskingum County (south)
Licking County (southwest)
Knox County (west)

Demographics

2000 census
As of the census of 2000, there were 36,655 people, 14,356 households, and 10,164 families living in the county. The population density was 65 people per square mile (25/km2). There were 16,107 housing units at an average density of 29 per square mile (11/km2). The racial makeup of the county was 97.35% White, 1.09% Black or African American, 0.17% Native American, 0.32% Asian, 0.03% Pacific Islander, 0.20% from other races, and 0.84% from two or more races. 0.59% of the population were Hispanic or Latino of any race. 29.4% were of German, 23.4% American, 11.6% English and 9.3% Irish ancestry according to Census 2000. 93.9% spoke English, 2.4% German, 1.5% Pennsylvania Dutch, and 0.9% Dutch as their first language.

There were 14,356 households, out of which 32.60% had children under the age of 18 living with them, 57.80% were married couples living together, 9.20% had a female householder with no husband present, and 29.20% were non-families. 25.40% of all households were made up of individuals, and 11.90% had someone living alone who was 65 years of age or older. The average household size was 2.52 and the average family size was 3.01.

In the county, the population was spread out, with 26.20% under the age of 18, 7.80% from 18 to 24, 27.40% from 25 to 44, 24.00% from 45 to 64, and 14.70% who were 65 years of age or older. The median age was 38 years. For every 100 females, there were 95.50 males. For every 100 females age 18 and over, there were 92.70 males.

The median income for a household in the county was $34,701, and the median income for a family was $41,676. Males had a median income of $31,095 versus $21,276 for females. The per capita income for the county was $16,364. About 7.00% of families and 9.10% of the population were below the poverty line, including 10.40% of those under age 18 and 9.10% of those age 65 or over.

2010 census
As of the 2010 United States Census, there were 36,901 people, 14,658 households, and 10,089 families living in the county. The racial makeup of the county was 97.0% white, 1.1% black or African American, 0.3% Asian, 0.2% American Indian, 0.2% from other races, and 1.2% from two or more races. Those of Hispanic or Latino origin made up 0.8% of the population. In terms of ancestry, 29.5% were German, 14.2% were Irish, 11.2% were English, and 10.3% were American.

Of the 14,658 households, 30.8% had children under the age of 18 living with them, 53.7% were married couples living together, 10.4% had a female householder with no husband present, 31.2% were non-families, and 26.3% of all households were made up of individuals. The average household size was 2.49 and the average family size was 2.98. The median age was 40.8 years.

The median income for a household in the county was $39,469 and the median income for a family was $47,931. Males had a median income of $39,701 versus $26,706 for females. The per capita income for the county was $19,635. About 12.4% of families and 17.0% of the population were below the poverty line, including 26.0% of those under age 18 and 8.3% of those age 65 or over.

Politics
Prior to 1912, Coshocton County was Democratic in presidential elections, only voting Republican twice from 1856 to 1908. The county was a bellwether from 1912 to 1936. But starting with the 1940 election it has become a Republican stronghold county with Lyndon B. Johnson in 1964 and Bill Clinton in 1992 being the two lone Democrats to win the county since then.

|}

Government

The county courts meet in the courthouse located in Coshocton. Built in 1875, it is still in use today.

Communities

City
Coshocton (county seat)

Villages
Conesville
Nellie
Plainfield
Warsaw
West Lafayette

Townships

Adams
Bedford
Bethlehem
Clark
Crawford
Franklin
Jackson
Jefferson
Keene
Lafayette
Linton
Mill Creek
Monroe
Newcastle
Oxford
Perry
Pike
Tiverton
Tuscarawas
Virginia
Washington
White Eyes

https://web.archive.org/web/20160715023447/http://www.ohiotownships.org/township-websites

Census-designated places
Canal Lewisville
Fresno

Unincorporated communities

Bacon
Bakersville
Blissfield
Chili
Hardscrabble
Keene
Layland
New Bedford
New Guilford
New Moscow
Newcastle
Spring Mountain
Tunnel Hill
Wakatomika
Walhonding
West Bedford
West Carlisle

See also
National Register of Historic Places listings in Coshocton County, Ohio

References

Further reading

 Thomas William Lewis, History of Southeastern Ohio and the Muskingum Valley, 1788-1928. In Three Volumes. Chicago: S.J. Clarke Publishing Co., 1928.

External links
Coshocton County Government's website 

 
Appalachian Ohio
Counties of Appalachia
1811 establishments in Ohio
Populated places established in 1811
Micropolitan areas of Ohio